Sophia Patsalidou (born 16 December 2000), known professionally as Sophia Patsalides, is a Greek-Cypriot singer. At 22 years old she holds a BA and master in music and performance. Her latest singles are developed with Sophie and the Giants producer Jo Pereira and co-written with Olivia Dean's songwriter, Glen Roberts. She recently opened American artist's LP concert in Limassol and is set to open Israeli star Hanan Ben Ari in February 2023. She left high school at 16 years old to pursue music at university level.

Earlier in her career, she represented her nation at the Junior Eurovision Song Contest 2014 with her song "I pio omorfi mera" (The most wonderful day).

Biography
Sophia Patsalides was born on 16 December 2000 in Nicosia, the capital city of Cyprus. She has been interested in music since she was little and started singing when she was 3.  She grew up listening to pop artists, such as Beyoncé.

Junior Eurovision 2014

On 21 July 2014, Sophia Patsalides was internally selected to represent Cyprus at the 12th annual Junior Eurovision Song Contest in Malta. She was the fifth to perform on the evening with her song I pio omorfi mera. Following the final, she said that she would "love" to participate in the adult Eurovision for Cyprus.

Discography

References

Living people
People from Nicosia
2000 births
Cypriot pop singers
Cypriot child singers
Cypriot expatriates in the United Kingdom
Junior Eurovision Song Contest entrants